A corn harvester is a machine used on farms to harvest corn, stripping the stalks about one foot from the ground shooting the stalks through the header to the ground. The corn is stripped from its stalk and then moves through the header to the intake conveyor belt. From there it goes up the conveying system through a fan system, separating the remaining stalks from the ears. The stalks blow out the fan duct into the field while the ears drop onto another conveyor belt. The ears ride the belt and drop into a large moving bucket. 

This method is done with both fresh corn and seed corn. 

The first mechanical corn harvester was developed in 1930 by Gleaner Harvester Combine Corporation of Independence, Missouri.  The unit was pulled by a tractor with the unit on the left side.

References

Harvesters